is a Japanese footballer for Vonds Ichihara.

Club career

SV Horn
Numa signed for SV Horn in January 2019.

Club statistics
Updated to 23 February 2019.

References

External links
Daiki Numa on Instagram
Profile at Gainare Tottori
Profile at SV Horn

1997 births
Living people
Association football people from Osaka Prefecture
People from Neyagawa, Osaka
Japanese footballers
J2 League players
J3 League players
Japan Football League players
2. Liga (Austria) players
Kyoto Sanga FC players
Gainare Tottori players
Tegevajaro Miyazaki players
SV Horn players
Association football forwards
Japanese expatriate footballers
Expatriate footballers in Austria